Raja, Rasoi Aur Anya Kahaniyaan ("Kings, Kitchens and Other Stories") is an Indian television series The EPIC Channel and takes viewers into the world of Indian cuisine. The show gives an inside look into the royal kitchens of India. The series explores the history behind the cuisine of the Indian royals, showing how dishes were discovered, and their significance in Indian history. It premiered on 24 December 2014 with 11 one-hour episodes. EPIC launched Season 2 of the show on 8 July 2015 with 24 half-hour episodes. The show highlights how food and taste transcended time and their significance in history. Season 3 of the show started broadcasting on 17 December 2021 with 5 half-hour episodes. Season 4 of the show started broadcasting on 14 October 2022 with 5 half-hour episodes.

Show summary
Raja, Rasoi Aur Anya Kahaniyaan provides information about historical events that influenced culinary practices in different parts of India. The show also features a combination of recipes using local herbs, rare fowls and elaborate preparation methods. Food writers and food enthusiasts also share anecdotes on the food habits of the maharajahs.

Show themes

Season one
 Episode 1 – Jodhpur & Jaipur
 Episode 2 – Tamil Nadu (Tanjore)
 Episode 3 – Delhi & Rampur
 Episode 4 – Jammu and Kashmir
 Episode 5 – Punjab
 Episode 6 – Himachal Pradesh
 Episode 7 – Banaras & Allahabad
 Episode 8 – Lucknow & Mahmudabad
 Episode 9 – Mysore & Coorg
 Episode 10 – Kerala
 Episode 11 – Gujarat

Season two
 Episode 1 – Hyderabad
 Episode 2 – Odisha
 Episode 3 – Chhattisgarh
 Episode 4 – Andhra Pradesh
 Episode 5 – Puducherry
 Episode 6 – Kolkata
 Episode 7 – Mangalore
 Episode 8 – Goa
 Episode 9 – Maharashtra
 Episode 10 – Assam
 Episode 11 – Mathura
 Episode 12 – Sikkim
 Episode 13 – Murshidabad
 Episode 14 – Nagaland
 Episode 15 – Mumbai
 Episode 16 – Meghalaya & Tripura
 Episode 17 – Bihar
 Episode 18 – Ladakh
 Episode 19 – Uttarkhand
 Episode 20 – Madhya Pradesh
 Episode 21 – Northern India
 Episode 22 – Southern India
 Episode 23 – Eastern India
 Episode 24 – Western India

Season three
 Episode 1 – Bikaner
 Episode 2 – Bhopal
 Episode 3 – Kochi
 Episode 4 – Kotwara
 Episode 5 – Jambughoda

Season four
 Episode 1 – Mayurbhanj
 Episode 2 – Bhainsrorgarh
 Episode 3 – Jhabua
 Episode 4 – Sandur
 Episode 5 – Purnia

Production
The show is produced by Rangrez Media Pvt. Ltd and Ashraf Abbas, Nidhi Tuli with concept & idea by Ashraf Abbas. Cinematography is by Ankit Trivedi, Swapnil Sonawane, Mohit Kakodkar, Laxman Anand, Aniruddha Barua, Jiten Lucky, Saptarishi and Deepak Arya while direction is by Akshar Pillai (season 1), Gaurav Mehra (Season 2) & George Verghese (for some episodes of Season 2). The show has been researched, developed and written by Raghav Khanna with voice over by Manwendra Tripathi. Prof. Pushpesh Pant, one of the noted food historian of India, has also been frequently featured in all of the episodes. Episodes have been shot in locations across regions where culinary practices and cuisines have been discovered.

Critical reception
Deccan Herald praised The EPIC Channel and the show that celebrates Indian food in all its diversity and complexity. It takes pride in India's varied culinary heritage and makes us reflect on the richness of diverse cuisines in our very own kitchens.

Since its original run on The EPIC Channel, Netflix India has obtained the show and the 1st season is now available on their website and app for viewing.

Spin-off Shows
In 2017, the show moved away from documentary format to a host based cookery show. Celebrity chef Ranveer Brar was the host for the season 1 of "Raja Rasoi and Andaz Anokha" . The show was 30 minutes in length and aired on The EPIC Channel.

The season 2 of chef based show is under production.

References

2014 Indian television series debuts
Indian cooking television series
Epic TV original programming